The 2017–18 Hawaii Rainbow Warriors basketball team represented the University of Hawaiʻi at Mānoa during the 2017–18 NCAA Division I men's basketball season. The Rainbow Warriors, led by third-year head coach Eran Ganot, played their home games at the Stan Sheriff Center in Honolulu, Hawaii, as members of the Big West Conference. They finished the season 17–13, 8–8 in Big West play to finish in sixth place. They lost in the quarterfinals of the Big West tournament to UC Irvine. They were invited to play in the CollegeInsider.com Postseason Tournament, but they declined the invitation, citing financial concerns.

Previous season
The Rainbow Warriors finished the 2016–17 season 14–16, 8–8 in Big West play to finish in fifth place. As the No. 5 seed in the Big West tournament, they were defeated by Long Beach State in the quarterfinals.

Departures

Incoming transfers

2017 Commitments

Roster

Schedule and results

|-
!colspan=9 style=| Exhibition

|-
!colspan=9 style=| Non-conference regular season

|-
!colspan=9 style=| Big West regular season

|-
!colspan=9 style=| Big West tournament

Source:

See also
2017–18 Hawaii Rainbow Wahine basketball team

References

Hawaii Rainbow Warriors basketball seasons
Hawaii
Hawaii Rainbow Warriors basketball
Hawaii Rainbow Warriors basketball